Air Commodore Ashley David Stevenson,  (born 30 September 1958) is a retired senior Royal Air Force (RAF) officer and a former Commandant of Royal Air Force College Cranwell.

Military career
Stevenson was commissioned into the Flying Branch as a flying officer from the ranks of the RAF on 25 February 1982. He conducted his flying training in the USA on the T-37 and T-38 aircraft, completing using the Hawk in the UK.

He was awarded the Queen's Commendation for Brave Conduct in 1992 for his actions in an ejection situation following a bird strike of his two-seat Harrier T.4 on 25 September 1991, where he rescued his rear seat passenger (the first woman to eject from a British combat jet) after she landed in the aircraft's burning wreckage. This was Stevenson's second ejection from a Harrier after he had ejected from a GR.5 on 17 October 1990.

As Officer Commanding No. 3 (Fighter) Squadron, Wing Commander Stevenson commanded the detachment of Harrier GR.7 aircraft deployed during the Sierra Leone crisis, the first operation conducted by the combined RAF/Royal Navy Joint Force Harrier.

Stevenson served as Station Commander RAF Wittering for two years and, on promotion to air commodore, was appointed Air Commodore Force Development Headquarters in No. 1 Group on 27 November 2006.

Stevenson was appointed to the newly created NATO post of Commander Kandahar Airfield, Afghanistan in July 2007. He then became Commandant Royal Air Force College Cranwell and Director of Recruiting in April 2008.

He was appointed a Commander of the Order of the British Empire (CBE) in the 2012 Birthday Honours.

References

|-

|-

|-

|-

|-

Commanders of the Order of the British Empire
Living people
Recipients of the Queen's Commendation for Brave Conduct
Royal Air Force officers
Royal Air Force personnel of the War in Afghanistan (2001–2021)
1958 births
Commandants of the Royal Air Force College Cranwell